Ricardo Menalda (born 28 September 1965) is a Brazilian fencer. He competed in the individual sabre event at the 1992 Summer Olympics.

References

External links
 

1965 births
Living people
Brazilian male sabre fencers
Olympic fencers of Brazil
Fencers at the 1992 Summer Olympics